Bhagwantpur is a village in Gautam Buddha Nagar district of the Indian state of Uttar Pradesh. Bhagwantpur and Chhatanga are two small villages under the gram panchayat of Jewar Tehsil.

Demographics
Bhagwantpur village had a total population of 1,241 at the 2011 census, with 231 families residing in the village. The sex ratio of village was 667 male, 574 female.

References

Villages in Gautam Buddh Nagar district